Echinometra lucunter, the rock boring urchin, is a species of sea urchin in the family Echinometridae. It is found in very shallow parts of the western Atlantic Ocean and the Caribbean Sea.

Description 
Echinometra lucunter has an elliptical rather than a round test (shell). It has moderately short spines with wide bases and sharp tips. The colour of the test varies from black to deep brownish-red, often being more ruddy on its aboral (upper) surface than on its oral (lower) surface. The spines are usually black.

Distribution and habitat 
Echinometra lucunter is common throughout the Caribbean Sea and also occurs in Florida, Bermuda and the South American coast as far south as Brazil. It is sometimes found among seagrasses and often under rock slabs or broken coral especially in places with high water movement. It sometimes occurs in large numbers and causes considerable damage to coral reefs through its boring activities.

Biology 
Echinometra lucunter uses the teeth that surround its mouth to grind away at the rock underneath it so as to make a hemispherical depression in which it takes refuge during the day. It emerges at night to graze on algae growing within a few centimetres (inches) of its home. It defends this hole against other sea urchins of its own species. The king helmet shell (Cassis tuberosa) feeds on it and several species of small goby conceal themselves underneath its test.

References 

Echinometridae
Animals described in 1758
Taxa named by Carl Linnaeus